The 2023 American Athletic Conference women's basketball tournament was held March 6–9, 2023, at Dickies Arena in Fort Worth, Texas. All games of the tournament were televised by ESPN Inc. The winner of the tournament will receive the conference's automatic bid to the 2023 NCAA tournament. East Carolina won the tournament and received the AAC automatic bid to the 2023 NCAA tournament.

Seeds
Teams were seeded by conference record. The top five teams received byes to the quarterfinals. 

Tiebreakers were applied as needed to properly seed the teams.

Schedule

Bracket 
* – Denotes overtime period

See also 
 2023 American Athletic Conference men's basketball tournament
 American Athletic Conference women's basketball tournament
 American Athletic Conference

References

External links 
 American Athletic Conference tournament Central

2022–23 American Athletic Conference women's basketball season
American Athletic Conference women's basketball tournament
Basketball competitions in Fort Worth, Texas
College sports tournaments in Texas
Women's sports in Texas
American Athletic Conference men's basketball tournament